Fletcher Peak is an 11,410-foot-elevation (3,478 meter) mountain summit located in Yosemite National Park, in Mariposa County, California, United States. It is situated south of Tuolumne Meadows in the Cathedral Range which is a sub-range of the Sierra Nevada mountain range. Precipitation runoff from this landform drains south to the Merced River via Fletcher Creek.

Etymology
Fletcher Creek and Fletcher Lake were named in 1895 by Lieutenant Nathaniel Fish McClure to honor Arthur G. Fletcher, deputy fish commissioner of California's State Board of Fish Commissioners, who directed the stocking of fish in the streams and lakes of Yosemite National Park. The peak was named in association, and this geographical feature's toponym was officially adopted in 1932 by the U.S. Board on Geographic Names. The landform had been named "Baker Peak" prior to the Fletcher name, for a Mr. Baker who was a cook at nearby Boothe Lake Camp.

Climate
According to the Köppen climate classification system, Fletcher Peak is located in an alpine climate zone. Most weather fronts originate in the Pacific Ocean, and travel east toward the Sierra Nevada mountains. As fronts approach, they are forced upward by the peaks (orographic lift), causing them to drop their moisture in the form of rain or snowfall onto the range.

See also
 
 Geology of the Yosemite area

Gallery

References

External links
 Weather forecast: Fletcher Peak

Mountains of Yosemite National Park
Mountains of Mariposa County, California
North American 3000 m summits
Mountains of Northern California
Sierra Nevada (United States)